Erdal Rakip (born 13 February 1996) is a professional footballer who plays for Turkish club Antalyaspor as a midfielder. Born in Sweden, he represents the North Macedonia national team.

Club career

Malmö FF 
Rakip made his Allsvenskan debut for Malmö FF in an away fixture against IF Brommapojkarna at Grimsta IP on 1 June 2013. On 17 June 2013, Rakip signed a two and a half year youth contract with Malmö FF until the end of the 2015 season. On 15 July 2014 Rakip signed a first team contract with Malmö FF for three and a half additional years at the club. The 2014 season saw more playing time for Rakip as he made 15 appearances for the club. He also participated in play during the group stage of the 2014–15 and 2015–16 UEFA Champions League.

Benfica 
After his contract with Malmö expired at the end of the 2017 Swedish season, Rakip signed for Portuguese champions Benfica.

Loan to Crystal Palace 
Before playing any games for them, he was loaned out for the rest of the 2017–18 season to English club Crystal Palace. Rakip ultimately did not end up playing in any games, but was an unused substitute for Crystal Palace in Premier League fixtures against Everton, Tottenham and Manchester United.

Return to Malmö FF 
On 11 February 2019, without having played any match for Benfica, Malmö FF announced Rakip's return to the Swedish club, reportedly for a €500,000 transfer fee, with Benfica being entitled to fifty per cent of a future transfer.

Antalyaspor 
On 20 January 2023, Rakip signed a 2.5-year contract with Antalyaspor in Turkey.

International career
Rakip entered his first international tournament at the 2013 FIFA U-17 World Cup in the United Arab Emirates where Sweden won a bronze medal, he scored his first international goal against Honduras in the quarter final. Rakip played six out of seven matches for Sweden during the tournament and scored one goal, he missed the first group stage match against Iraq due to a previous suspension.

Rakip holds the citizenship of Sweden and North Macedonia and is of Turkish and Albanian descent. He debuted with the North Macedonia national team in a 4–0 2022 FIFA World Cup qualification win over Liechtenstein on 8 October 2021.

Career statistics

Club

Honours
Malmö FF
Allsvenskan: 2013, 2014, 2016, 2017, 2020, 2021
Svenska Cupen: 2021–22
Svenska Supercupen: 2014

Sweden U17
2013 FIFA U-17 World Cup: Third place

References

External links
 Malmö FF profile 
 
 
 
 

1996 births
Living people
Footballers from Skåne County
Association football midfielders
Macedonian footballers
North Macedonia international footballers
Swedish footballers
Sweden youth international footballers
Sweden under-21 international footballers
Swedish people of Macedonian descent
Swedish people of Albanian descent
Swedish people of Turkish descent
Albanians in North Macedonia
Macedonian people of Turkish descent
Malmö FF players
S.L. Benfica footballers
Crystal Palace F.C. players
Antalyaspor footballers
Allsvenskan players
Süper Lig players
Swedish expatriate footballers
Macedonian expatriate footballers
Swedish expatriate sportspeople in Portugal
Swedish expatriate sportspeople in England
Swedish expatriate sportspeople in Turkey
Macedonian expatriate sportspeople in Portugal
Macedonian expatriate sportspeople in England
Macedonian expatriate sportspeople in Turkey
Expatriate footballers in Portugal
Expatriate footballers in England
Expatriate footballers in Turkey